Bazhou or Ba Prefecture was a zhou (prefecture) in imperial China in modern Bazhou City, Hebei, China. It existed (intermittently) from 959 to 1913.

The modern city of Bazhou, created in 1990, retains its name.

Geography
The administrative region of Ba Prefecture in Later Zhou is in modern Langfang, Hebei on its western border with Tianjin. It probably includes parts of modern: 
Bazhou City
Wen'an County
Dacheng County

References
 

Prefectures of the Jin dynasty (1115–1234)
Prefectures of the Song dynasty
Prefectures of the Yuan dynasty
Subprefectures of the Ming dynasty
Departments of the Qing dynasty
Prefectures of Later Zhou
Former prefectures in Hebei